Ethel Edwards (1914– 1999) was an American painter, collage artist, illustrator, and muralist. She is known for her New Deal murals.

Education
In 1933 she entered Newcomb College in New Orleans  where she studied  with Xavier Gonzalez. She married Gonzales in 1936 in Alpine, Texas, where he had conducted a summer art colony for several years.

Career
They continued the summer art school until 1936 when Xavier took a leave of absence to live in France. Returning to Alpine with her husband in late 1937, Edwards won a national competition to paint a post office mural, Afternoon on a Texas Ranch,  for Lampasas, Texas.  In 1942 she completed a mural, Life on the Lake for the post office in Lake Providence, Louisiana.

During the World War II war years Edwards and Gonzales moved to New York City where they both taught at the Art Students League and she did fashion illustrations for Town & Country and Fortune magazines. From 1942 to 1949, the couple lived in New York City and spent summers at Wellfleet, Massachusetts on Cape Cod. Edwards later taught at the Art Students League of New York and the  Truro Center of the Arts. In 1957 Edwards was the recipient of a MacDowell fellowship.

Edwards died on January 24, 1999, in New York City.

The Xavier Gonzalez and Ethel Edwards Travel Grant given by The Art Students League of New York was first awarded in 2002; it provides stipends to artists for travel in Spain.

Works

Her papers can be found in the Archives of American Art in the Smithsonian Institution in Washington D.C.

Her paintings are in the collections of the Smithsonian American Art Museum and the United States Bureau of Reclamation.

References

1914 births
1999 deaths
Art Students League of New York faculty
American women painters
Modern painters
20th-century American painters
American muralists
Section of Painting and Sculpture artists
American women illustrators
American illustrators
Artists from New Orleans
Painters from Louisiana
H. Sophie Newcomb Memorial College alumni
20th-century American women artists
Women muralists
People from Opelousas, Louisiana
People from Alpine, Texas
American women academics